The Frühjahrs-Meile is a Group 3 flat horse race in Germany open to thoroughbreds aged four years or older. It is run over a distance of 1,600 metres (about 1 mile) at Düsseldorf in April.

History
The event was established in 1982, and it was originally called the Ostermann-Pokal. It was initially contested over 1,200 metres at Gelsenkirchen. For a period it was held in June, July or August and open to horses aged three or older.

The Ostermann-Pokal was transferred to Cologne and extended to 1,600 metres in 1988. It was run under various sponsored titles after 1999.

The race moved to Frankfurt and became known as the Grosse Hessen Meile in 2007. It was renamed the Frankfurter Meile, switched to April and closed to three-year-olds in 2010.

The event was relocated to Düsseldorf and registered as the Frühjahrs-Meile in 2011. It is currently Germany's first Group race of the year.

Records
Most successful horse (3 wins):
 Power Flame – 1997, 1998, 2000

Leading jockey (3 wins):
 Adrie de Vries – Alianthus (2011, 2012), Global Thrill (2013)

Leading trainer (3 wins):
 Andreas Wöhler – Power Flame (1997, 1998, 2000)
 Jens Hirschberger – Alianthus (2011, 2012), Global Thrill (2013)

Winners

See also
 List of German flat horse races
 Recurring sporting events established in 1982 – this race is included under its original title, Ostermann-Pokal.

References
 Racing Post:
 galopp-sieger.de – Große Hessen-Meile (vormals Ostermann-Pokal).
 horseracingintfed.com – International Federation of Horseracing Authorities – Frühjahrs-Meile (2013).
 pedigreequery.com – Grosse Hessen Meile – Frankfurt.
 pedigreequery.com – Ostermann-Pokal – Köln.

Open mile category horse races
Sport in Düsseldorf
Horse races in Germany